Amanda Tomlinson (née Ford, born 25 July 1970) is a former rugby union player. She was named as a reserve, but did not feature, in the Black Ferns match against the Californian Grizzlies at Lancaster Park in Christchurch; on 22 July 1989.

At RugbyFest 1990, she played for the University of Canterbury, the New Zealand Teachers College selection and New Zealand. She was selected for the 1991 Women's Rugby World Cup squad.

Tomlinson currently competes in Harness racing, a form of horse racing. In 2021, she had her first win as a trainer.

References 

1970 births
Living people
New Zealand women's international rugby union players
New Zealand female rugby union players
New Zealand harness racers